is a Japanese road racing cyclist, who last rode for UCI Continental team .

Manabe participated in the 1996 Summer Olympics in the men's individual road race, but did not finish. He was third in the Japanese National Road Race Championships in 1998, 2003 and 2005.

Major results

1998
3rd Road race, National Road Championships
3rd Tour de Okinawa
1999
3rd Tour de Hokkaido
2000
2nd Tour de Okinawa
2003
1st Stage 1 Tour de Taiwan
3rd Road race, National Road Championships
3rd Overall Tour of China
1st Stage 3
2004
10th Tour de Okinawa
2005
3rd Road race, National Road Championships
2006
10th Overall Tour de Hokkaido
2008
10th Overall Tour de Kumano
2010
10th Overall Tour de Okinawa

References

External links

1970 births
Living people
Japanese male cyclists
Olympic cyclists of Japan
Cyclists at the 1996 Summer Olympics
Cyclists at the 1994 Asian Games
Cyclists at the 1998 Asian Games
Asian Games competitors for Japan
People from Mitoyo, Kagawa